The artistic gymnastics competition of the 2006 Central American and Caribbean Games was held in Cartagena, Colombia, from 15–30 July 2006.



Medal summary

Men's events

Women's events

See also 
 Rhythmic gymnastics at the 2006 Central American and Caribbean Games

References

2006 Central American and Caribbean Games
Central American and Caribbean Games Artistic gymnastics
2006